Whirlpool is a 1934 American pre-Code drama film directed by Roy William Neill and starring Jack Holt and Jean Arthur. The screenplay concerns a carnival owner convicted of manslaughter after a man is killed in a fight.

Plot
Buck Rankin is a shady carnival promoter who falls in love with Helen and decides to go straight and sell the carnival. However, a fight over a con game causes a melee at the carnival, during which Rankin accidentally kills a man. He is convicted of manslaughter and sentenced to 20 years in prison. Eight months later, Helen reveals to him in prison that she is pregnant with his child and refuses his request that she divorce him.

For the good of his wife and child, Rankin decides to fake his own death. After seeing fellow prisoner Farley leap to his death in the roiling waters and deadly whirlpool surrounding the prison, Rankin forges a letter to Helen informing her that he died while attempting to escape and that his body had not been found.

Many years later, Rankin is released from prison. He adopts the alias Duke Sheldon and, with his carnival partner Mac, becomes wealthy by using the skills that Rankin learned while incarcerated. Helen has since married judge Jim Morrison. Sandra, Rankin's daughter by Helen, is a newspaper reporter engaged to marry fellow reporter Bob Andrews, but she knows nothing of her father's existence.

Sandra is assigned to write a story on Duke and recognizes him as her father from an old photograph that Helen has kept. She reveals herself to him as his daughter and he is overjoyed. Despite having kept a low profile, Rankin is to testify on behalf of a fellow gangster, which will court unwanted publicity that could humiliate Helen, who is unintentionally guilty of bigamy because she and Rankin were never officially divorced.

Rankin kills the gangster's lawyer, who had been pressuring him to testify and intended to inform reporters of Rankin's sordid past. Rankin turns the gun on himself and commits suicide with reporters just outside his door, the secret of his past life hidden forever.

Cast
 Jack Holt as Buck Rankin/Duke Sheldon
 Jean Arthur as Sandra Rankin Morrison  
 Donald Cook as Bob Andrews  
 Allen Jenkins as Mac  
 Lila Lee as Helen Rankin Morrison  
 John Miljan as Barney Gaige  
 Rita La Roy as Thelma  
 Oscar Apfel as Newspaper Editor  
 Willard Robertson as Judge Jim Morrison  
 Ward Bond as Farley

External links 
 
 
 
 

1934 films
1934 drama films
American black-and-white films
Films directed by Roy William Neill
Columbia Pictures films
Films based on short fiction
American drama films
Films produced by Robert North
1930s English-language films
1930s American films